Creighton is a Scottish and Irish habitational name that comes from the barony of Crichton in Midlothian, Scotland. It is derived from Gaelic  (border) and Middle English  (settlement). Notable people with the name include:

Surname 
 Abraham Creighton (disambiguation)
 Abraham Creighton (died 1706), MP for Fermanagh and Enniskillen
 Abraham Creighton, 1st Baron Erne (1703–1772)
 Abraham Creighton (died 1809), MP for Lifford
 Abraham Creighton, 2nd Earl Erne (1765–1842)
 Adam Creighton (ice hockey) (born 1965), Canadian ice hockey player
 Adam Creighton (journalist), Australian economist and journalist
 Anthony Creighton (1922–2005), British playwright
 Billy Creighton (1892–1970), Canadian ice hockey player
 Brandon Creighton (born 1970), American politician
 Breen Creighton, Australian professor of law
 Charles Creighton (disambiguation)
 Charles Creighton (physician) (1847–1927), British physician, opponent of vaccination
 Charles Creighton (referee) (1876–1949), Irish-American soccer referee
 Charles F. Creighton (1863–1907), Attorney General of the Kingdom of Hawaii
 Charles W. Creighton (1885–1947), American politician and lawyer
 Chris Creighton (born 1969), American football coach
 D. F. Creighton (1858–1936), American architect, mechanical engineer, and construction manager
 Dave Creighton (1930–2017), Canadian ice hockey player
 David Creighton (1843–1917), Canadian businessman and politician
 Donald Creighton (1902–1979), Canadian historian
 Donna Creighton (born 1985), British bobsledder and skeleton racer
 Edward Creighton (1820–1874), American pioneer businessman
 Ernest Creighton (1859–1931), English first-class cricketer
 Eugene Creighton, First Nation Judge of the Provincial Court of Alberta, Canada
 Frank W. Creighton (1879–1948), American Episcopal bishop
 Fred Creighton (1930–2011), Canadian ice hockey player and coach
 Guy Creighton (born 1949), Australian equestrian
 Harriet Creighton (1909–2004), American botanist, geneticist and educator
 Helen Creighton (1899–1989), Canadian folklorist
 James Creighton (disambiguation)
 James Creighton (ice hockey) (1850–1930), Canadian ice hockey pioneer
 James Edwin Creighton (1861–1924), American philosopher
 James Forbes Creighton (1879–1944), Canadian physician and politician
 James George Aylwin Creighton or J.G.A. Creighton, father of organized ice hockey
 James M. Creighton (1856–1946), American architect
 Jamie Creighton (1983), Scottish International Athlete
 Jim Creighton (1841–1862), American baseball player
 Jim Creighton (basketball) (born 1950), American basketball player
 Jimmy Creighton (1905–1990), Canadian ice hockey player
 Joanne V. Creighton (born 1942), American academic and President of Mount Holyoke College, South Hadley, Massachusetts
 John Creighton (disambiguation)
 John Creighton (archaeologist), British archaeologist and academic
 John Creighton (British Army officer) (1772–1833), MP for Lifford (Parliament of Ireland constituency)
John Creighton, American naval officer involved in the Little Belt affair in 1811
 John Creighton (judge) (1721–1807), Canadian lawyer and judge
 John Creighton (Nova Scotia politician) (1794–1878), Canadian lawyer and politician
 John Creighton (priest) (fl. 1643–1670), Irish Chancellor of Christ Church Cathedral and Dean of Ferns
 John Creighton (rugby union) (born 1937), New Zealand rugby union player
 John Creighton (surgeon) (1768–1827), Irish president of the Royal College of Surgeons in Ireland
 John Creighton (warden) (1817–1885), Canadian merchant, politician and prison official
 John Creighton, 1st Earl Erne (1731–1828), Irish peer
 John A. Creighton (1831–1907), American pioneer businessman
 John Oliver Creighton (born 1943), American astronaut
 John W. Creighton Jr. (born 1933), American businessman
 John Creighton, American naval officer involved in the Little Belt affair in 1811
 Louise Creighton (1850–1936), British author
 Lucinda Creighton (born 1980), Irish Fine Gael politician
 Mandell Creighton (1843–1901), British historian and bishop
 Margaret Creighton, American historian, writer and professor emerita at Bates College, Maine
 Mark Creighton (born 1981), English professional footballer
 Mary Frances Creighton (1899–1936s–1936), convicted American murderer, executed in 1936
 Mary Lucretia Creighton (1834–1876), American philanthropist
 Michael Creighton (disambiguation)
 Michael Cyril Creighton, American actor and writer
 Michael W. Creighton, bishop of the Episcopal Diocese of Central Pennsylvania
 Milan Creighton (1908–1998), American football player and coach
 Neal Creighton (born 1965), American entrepreneur
 Richard D. Creighton (1924–1988), Korean War flying ace
 Shaun Creighton (born 1967), Australian long-distance runner
 Thomas Creighton (prospector) (20th Century), Canadian prospector
 Thomas C. Creighton (born 1945), American politician
 Thomas H. Creighton (1865–1942), American lawyer and politician
 William Creighton (disambiguation)
 William Creighton Jr. (1778–1851), American attorney, banker and politician
 William Black Creighton (1864–1946), Canadian social reformer
 William Steel Creighton (1902–1973), American myrmecologist and taxonomist
 William Creighton (bishop) (1909–1987), American Episcopal bishop

Given name
 Creighton Abrams (1914–1974), United States Army General
 Creighton Burns (1925–2008), Australian journalist and academic
 Creighton Carvello (1944–2008), British mnemonist
 Creighton Tull Chaney (1906–1973), American actor better known as Lon Chaney Jr.
 Creighton Gubanich (born 1972), American professional baseball player
 Creighton Hale (1882–1965), Irish-American actor born Patrick Fitzgerald
 Creighton Jones, Presiding Bishop of the Orthodox Anglican Church and Metropolitan Archbishop of the Orthodox Anglican Communion
 Creighton Miller (1922–2002), American football player and attorney
 Creighton Redman (born 1933), British rower
 Creighton Leland Robertson (1944–2014), bishop of the Episcopal Diocese of South Dakota

Characters
 Creighton Bernette, a character from Treme season 1

See also
 Crighton, a surname

References